Holving is a commune in the Moselle department in Grand Est in north-eastern France.

Localities of the commune: Ballering, Bettring, Diederfing, Hinsing, Hirbach, Netzwinkel, Schmalhof, Weiherfeld.

See also
 Communes of the Moselle department

References

External links
 

Communes of Moselle (department)